Action Forms was a Ukrainian video game development company based in Kyiv.

History 
Action Forms was founded in 1995. In 1997, their debut game Chasm: The Rift was released. Subsequently, the company earned recognition as developer of the first three games in the Carnivores series. The company used their own game engine AtmosFear in every released game since Carnivores. In 2005, Vivisector: Beast Within and «Остров Сокровищ» (Ostrov Sokrovisch) based on the Soviet animated film Treasure Island, which itself was based on the novel of the same name by Robert Louis Stevenson, were released. In 2008, Cryostasis: Sleep of Reason, which uses modified game engine AtmosFear 2.0, (though it was actually the fourth major generation of the engine) was released. Since 2011, Action Forms is currently dormant. Main members of the company created the game development studio Tatem Games, focused on games for iOS platform and revived the Carnivores franchise.

List of games 
 Chasm: The Rift (1997) (DOS)
 Carnivores (1998)
 Carnivores 2 (1999)
 Carnivores: Ice Age (2001)
 Duke Nukem: Endangered Species (cancelled)
 Ostrov Sokrovishch (Остров сокровищ. Aka. Treasure Island, based on the animated Treasure Island (1988 film)) (2005)
 Vivisector: Beast Within (2005)
 Adventures of Captain Wrongel (Announced 2006. Cancelled in 2009. UA title: Пригоди капітана Вронгеля. Based on the animated series, Adventures of Captain Wrongel.)
 Cryostasis: Sleep of Reason (2008)
 Carnivores: Dinosaur Hunter (2010) (iOS, PlayStation Portable) (in collaboration with Tatem Games)
 Adventures of Talking Tom (cancelled project in 2010/with Outfit7)
 Carnivores: Ice Age (2011) (iOS) (in collaboration with Tatem Games)
 Mowgli's Adventures (cancelled project in 2011)

References

External links 
 Official website (archived)
 

Defunct video game companies of Ukraine
Video game development companies
Video game companies established in 1995
Companies based in Kyiv
Ukrainian companies established in 1995